The Canine Hills are a line of mostly snow-covered hills and ridges trending northwest–southeast for  and forming the eastern half of Molar Massif in the Bowers Mountains, a major mountain range situated in Victoria Land, Antarctica. They were named by the New Zealand Antarctic Place-Names Committee in 1983 from a proposal by geologist M.G. Laird, after canine teeth, in association with other tooth-related names nearby: Molar Massif and Incisor Ridge. The hills lie situated on the Pennell Coast, a portion of Antarctica lying between Cape Williams and Cape Adare.

References 

Hills of Victoria Land
Pennell Coast